Androstenediol may refer to:

 5-Androstenediol (androst-5-ene-3β,17β-diol) – an endogenous weak androgen and estrogen and intermediate to/prohormone of testosterone
 4-Androstenediol (androst-4-ene-3β,17β-diol) – a weak androgen and prohormone of testosterone and hence an anabolic-androgenic steroid
 1-Androstenediol (5α-androst-1-ene-3β,17β-diol) – a prohormone of 1-testosterone (Δ1-) and hence an anabolic-androgenic steroid

See also
 Androstanediol
 Androstenedione
 Dehydroepiandrosterone
 Androstenolone
 Androstanedione
 Androstanolone

Androstanes
World Anti-Doping Agency prohibited substances